Dunn County is a county in the U.S. state of North Dakota. As of the 2020 census, the population was 4,095. Its county seat is Manning.

History
On March 9, 1883, the Dakota Territory legislature authorized the creation of a new county, using territory partitioned from Howard County (which is now extinct). The county organization was not effected at that time, but the county was not attached to another county for judicial purposes.

The county boundaries were altered in 1883, and on November 3, 1896, the legislature ordered Dunn dissolved, with its territory assigned to Stark County. However, the state supreme court overturned the legislature's act on May 24, 1901; in effect re-creating Dunn County. The county was still not assigned to another county. This was resolved on March 10, 1903, when the county was assigned to Stark County for judicial purposes.

On March 13, 1903, the legislature again voted to dissolve Dunn County, but again (during the 1905 session) the state supreme court voided the act. Dunn County continued to be attached to Stark County. However, on January 18, 1908, the county organization was effected, and Dunn became a standalone county. In the process, Dunn gained a tract of previously unattached land from Stark County, enlarging its boundary. The configuration thus created has remained to the present. The county was named for John Piatt Dunn, who opened the first drugstore in North Dakota, and who was a civic and commercial leader during the early history of Bismarck.

Geography
The Missouri River flows southeasterly along the northeastern boundary of Dunn County, and the Little Missouri River flows eastward across the center part of the county, to its confluence with the Missouri in the northeastern part of the county. The county terrain consists of semi-arid rolling hills, which are etched in the north and east by gullies and drainages to the river valleys. The terrain slopes to the east and north; its highest point is a hill at the southwestern corner, at 2,625' (800m) ASL. It is the fifth-largest county in North Dakota by total area.

Dunn County is somewhat unusual among western North Dakota counties. Like other counties in the region, it has both prairie and badlands areas. Located in the northwest part of the county are the Killdeer Mountains, which are more accurately described as hills. These hills help create a mini-ecosystem on the southern edge of the Little Missouri badlands, which has a greater abundance of aspen forests and wildlife than is typically found in southwestern North Dakota. The Killdeer Mountains' highest point, and the highest point in Dunn County, is 3281 feet above sea level.

The northwest corner of the county, northwest of the Killdeer Mountains, features many square miles of bur oak forest, mainly on the north-facing slopes of the hills. Bur oak and quaking aspen, though native to North Dakota, are sparse in western North Dakota, with Dunn County being a notable exception.

Major highways
  North Dakota Highway 8
  North Dakota Highway 22
  North Dakota Highway 200

Adjacent counties

 Mountrail County – north
 McLean County – northeast
 Mercer County – east
 Stark County – south
 Billings County – southwest
 McKenzie County – northwest

Protected areas

 Lake Ilo National Wildlife Refuge
 Little Missouri Public Use Area
 Kildeer Mountain State Game Preserve
 Badlands Trail Rides
 Little Mountain State Park

Lakes
 Moffet Slough

Demographics

2000 census
As of the 2000 census, there were 3,600 people, 1,378 households, and 986 families in the county. The population density was 2 people per square mile (1/km2). There were 1,965 housing units at an average density of 0.98 per square mile (0.38/km2). The racial makeup of the county was 86.58% White, 0.03% Black or African American, 12.44% Native American, 0.08% Asian, and 0.86% from two or more races. 0.75% of the population were Hispanic or Latino of any race. 43.2% were of German and 16.6% Norwegian ancestry.

There were 1,378 households, out of which 32.00% had children under the age of 18 living with them, 60.30% were married couples living together, 7.20% had a female householder with no husband present, and 28.40% were non-families. 25.30% of all households were made up of individuals, and 12.30% had someone living alone who was 65 years of age or older. The average household size was 2.57 and the average family size was 3.11.

The county population contained 27.40% under the age of 18, 5.80% from 18 to 24, 23.60% from 25 to 44, 25.90% from 45 to 64, and 17.40% who were 65 years of age or older. The median age was 41 years. For every 100 females there were 104.20 males. For every 100 females age 18 and over, there were 103.60 males.

The median income for a household in the county was $30,015, and the median income for a family was $34,405. Males had a median income of $26,226 versus $17,143 for females. The per capita income for the county was $14,624. About 13.80% of families and 17.50% of the population were below the poverty line, including 21.70% of those under age 18 and 14.20% of those age 65 or over.

2010 census
As of the 2010 census, there were 3,536 people, 1,401 households, and 977 families in the county. The racial makeup of the county was 84.9% white, 12.7% American Indian, 0.3% Asian, 0.2% black or African American, 0.2% from other races, and 1.7% from two or more races. Those of Hispanic or Latino origin made up 1.1% of the population. In terms of ancestry, 57.6% were German, 20.3% were Norwegian, 8.5% were Czech, 6.0% were Russian, 5.7% were Irish, 5.3% were English, and 1.8% were American.

Of the 1,401 households, 28.1% had children under the age of 18 living with them, 57.7% were married couples living together, 6.6% had a female householder with no husband present, 30.3% were non-families, and 26.5% of all households were made up of individuals. The average household size was 2.43 and the average family size was 2.93. The median age was 44.4 years.

The median income for a household in the county was $48,707 and the median income for a family was $65,122. Males had a median income of $37,270 versus $23,599 for females. The per capita income for the county was $24,832. About 6.2% of families and 8.6% of the population were below the poverty line, including 7.5% of those under age 18 and 12.1% of those age 65 or over.

Sites of interest
 Killdeer Mountains
 Killdeer Mountain National Battlefield

Communities

Cities

 Dodge
 Dunn Center
 Halliday
 Killdeer

Census-designated place
 Manning (county seat)

Unincorporated communities

 Emerson
 Fayette
 Hirschville
 Marshall
 Medicine Hole
 New Hradec
 Twin Buttes
 Werner

Politics
Dunn County has voted Republican in every election since 1976.

Education
School districts include:

K-12:

 Beulah Public School District 27
 Dickinson Public School District 1
 Halliday Public School District 19
 Hebron Public School District 13
 Killdeer Public School District 16
 Mandaree Public School District 36
 Richardton-Taylor Public School District 34
 South Heart Public School District 9

Elementary:
 Twin Buttes Public School District 37

See also
 National Register of Historic Places listings in Dunn County, North Dakota

References

External links
 Killdeer Mountain Scenic Byway
 Little Missouri State Park
 Dunn County maps, Sheet 1 (northern) and Sheet 2 (southern), North Dakota DOT

 
North Dakota counties on the Missouri River
1908 establishments in North Dakota
Populated places established in 1908
Counties in multiple time zones